Uhtjärv is a lake of Estonia.

See also
List of lakes in Estonia

Lakes of Estonia
Antsla  Parish
Lakes of Võru County